Larisa is a genus of moths belonging to the subfamily Olethreutinae of the family Tortricidae. It contains only one species, Larisa subsolana, which is found in North America, where it has been recorded from Alabama, Florida, Georgia, Illinois, Indiana, Kentucky, Maine, Maryland, Massachusetts, Minnesota, Mississippi, Missouri, New York, Ohio, Oklahoma, Ontario, Quebec, South Carolina, Tennessee, Texas, Virginia, and West Virginia.

The larvae feed on Carya illinoensis.

See also
List of Tortricidae genera

References

External links
tortricidae.com

Grapholitini
Moths of North America
Moths described in 1978